Sportsperson of the Year is an award given by the Sport Journalists' Club (KSN) to the best Sportsperson and the best Sport Team of the given year in the Czech Republic. For the first time it was awarded after the dissolution of Czechoslovakia in 1993, following the previous trophy Sportsperson of the Year of Czechoslovakia. Since 2000, the KSN has voted also for a Sport Legend. This award has been called The Emil Zátopek Award since 2001, after the first chosen legend, runner Emil Zátopek. Since 2002, Czech Foundation of the Sport Representation in cooperation with the KSN awards also the best Czech Junior Sportsperson of the Year.

Sportsperson of the Year

Junior Sportsperson of the Year

The Emil Zátopek Award (Sport Legend)

See also
Sportsperson of the Year (Czechoslovakia)

External links
Official website of the award (Czech)
 Sportovec roku on a website of KSN (Czech)
 Press release Sportsman of the Year 2006 (Czech)
 Junior Sportsperson of the Year 2002 (Czech)

Sport in the Czech Republic
Czech
Awards established in 1993
1993 establishments in the Czech Republic
Czech sports trophies and awards